is a Japanese actress, voice actress and singer from Kanagawa Prefecture, Japan. In 2014, at the 4th Newtype Anime awards, she won a voice actor award (female).

Biography
After going through the Japan Narration Acting Institute, she joined Arts Vision. Nakamura was 19 years old when she passed her first audition. This is a game work that will become THE iDOLM@STER series and will continue to play Haruka Amami for more than 10 years, but at the time it was an audition to put it in a company competition saying `` A prototype is not famous for a child who is not famous, and the title was decided had not. At the time of commercialization, Nakamura may have been dropped, but it is hoped that Haruka will continue her career. Nakamura said, "I'm afraid of the song anyway," and suggested that only the song be changed to another person. However, the music team said, "If you have the power to sing, it's OK.".

In October 2014, she was appointed as Tokushima Anime Ambassador.

On November 19, 2019, Nakamura announced that she had gotten married.

Filmography

Anime
Bold denotes leading roles.
Ballad of a Shinigami, Sawako
Ben-To, Chapatsu
Caligula, Mirei
Concrete Revolutio, Fuurouta
Gintama, Matsuko
Hetalia: Axis Powers, Belgium
  Kaichuu, Gonzuburou Sasaki
Hachigatsu no Cinderella Nine, Momoko Kakehashi
Hoshizora e Kakaru Hashi, Ui Nakatsugawa
Koi to Senkyo to Chocolate, Chisato Sumiyoshi
Shin Koihime Musō, Enjutsu (Miu)
The Idolmaster franchise, Haruka Amami (except for Idolmaster: Xenoglossia)
Magi: The Labyrinth of Magic, Dunya Musta'sim
Oniichan no Koto Nanka Zenzen Suki Janain Dakara ne!!, Haruka Katō
Oretachi ni Tsubasa wa Nai, Youji Haneda (childhood)
Popotan, Male student
Space Battleship Yamato 2199, Mikage Kiryū
Walkure Romanze: Shōjo Kishi Monogatari, Noel Marres Ascot

Video games
Aiyoku no Eustia, Licia de novus Yurii
Akashic Records, Brunhilde
Akiba's Trip, Mana Kitada
Akiba's Trip 2, Shion Kasugai
Armored Core 3, Extras
Azur Lane, HMS Victorious
Dungeon Travelers 2, Monica Macy
Eden*, Lavinia F. Asai
Freedom Wars, Beatrice 'Lily' Anastasi
Grimoire ~ Shiritsu Grimoire Mahou Gakuen ~, Ren Nanjo
Moero Chronicle, Coco
Rage of Bahamut, Pamela

References

External links
 Official agency profile 
 

1981 births
Living people
Arts Vision voice actors
Japanese women singers
Japanese stage actresses
Japanese video game actresses
Japanese voice actresses
Voice actresses from Kanagawa Prefecture
21st-century Japanese actresses